Andrew Jay MacWilliam (born March 25, 1990) is a Canadian professional ice hockey defenceman who is currently playing under contract with EC Red Bull Salzburg of the ICE Hockey League (ICEHL).

Playing career
Chosen in the 7th round of the 2008 Entry Draft (188th overall) by the Toronto Maple Leafs, he would make his NHL debut on March 11, 2015, recording 1 point in a 4–3 Toronto victory over the Buffalo Sabres. He was also named 3rd star of the game and went on to finish the season with the Toronto Maple Leafs, playing a total of 12 games. MacWilliam wore number 57 during his time with the Maple Leafs, becoming the first player in franchise history to wear the number.

On July 3, 2015, MacWilliam signed as a free agent to a one-year, two-way contract with the Winnipeg Jets. On July 1, 2016, as a free agent for a second consecutive season, MacWilliam left the Winnipeg Jets to sign a one-year, two-way deal with the New Jersey Devils.

On July 4, 2017, having left the Devils as a free agent, MacWilliam with slim NHL interest opted to continue in the AHL, signing a contract with the Rochester Americans, affiliate to the Buffalo Sabres.

With the following 2020–21 North American season delayed due to the COVID-19 pandemic, MacWilliam opted to pursue a career abroad, agreeing to an initial try-out with German three-time champions, EHC München of the DEL. On December 2, 2020, MacWilliam agreed to remain in Munich for the remainder of the 2020–21 season.

After two seasons in the DEL, MacWilliam left Germany and joined the neighbouring ICEHL, by signing a contract within the Red Bull sponsorship of EC Red Bull Salzburg on July 18, 2022.

Personal
Prior to his professional hockey career, MacWilliam attended the University of North Dakota, where he also played hockey and was honoured as captain in his senior year. He graduated with a degree in Business Management.

Career statistics

References

External links
 

1990 births
Albany Devils players
Camrose Kodiaks players
Canadian ice hockey players
Canadian ice hockey defencemen
Living people
Manitoba Moose players
EHC München players
North Dakota Fighting Hawks men's ice hockey players
EC Red Bull Salzburg players
Rochester Americans players
Ice hockey people from Calgary
Toronto Maple Leafs draft picks
Toronto Maple Leafs players
Toronto Marlies players